James William Bligh (1810 – 1 December 1869) was an English-born Australian politician.

He was born at Bodmin in Cornwall to conveyancer John Martyn Bligh and Mary Edyreun Hocking. He was a solicitor and migrated to South Australia in 1839. He moved to Sydney and practiced as a solicitor from 1841. He ceased practising due to ill health in the early 1850s. From 1851 to 1856 Bligh was an elected member of the New South Wales Legislative Council. He served in the reconstituted Council from 1856 to 1859 and was the first chairman of Willoughby Council from 1865 to 1867. Bligh died at Woolloomooloo in 1869.

References

 

1810 births
1869 deaths
Members of the New South Wales Legislative Council
19th-century Australian politicians